The Bukit Timah Satellite Earth Station (Chinese: 武吉知马卫星地面站) is the second satellite earth station in Singapore after Sentosa Satellite Earth Station in Sentosa Island. The station is located in Bukit Timah near Chantek flyover between Bukit Timah Expressway (BKE) and Pan Island Expressway (PIE). This station is managed and owned by Singtel with the building starting construction in 1983 and started operations in 1986. As it is located next to the BKE, motorists coming into Singapore via the causeway see this as their first landmark other than Woodlands.

See also
Singtel
Bukit Timah

References

Earth stations in Singapore
1986 establishments in Singapore